Speirs Major (formerly Speirs + Major, Speirs and Major Associates) is a UK lighting design practice founded by Jonathan Speirs (1958-2012) and Mark Major in 1993. The practice is noted for its illumination of many prominent buildings, including Barajas International Airport, 30 St Mary Axe (‘The Gherkin’), the Millennium Dome and the interior of St. Pauls Cathedral. The firm has also developed lighting master plans for several British cities, including Cambridge, Coventry, Durham, Newcastle, and for major private developments including Greenwich Peninsula and King’s Cross Central, London.

Speirs Major has been credited with helping to raise awareness of the lighting design profession in the UK. Today it employs approximately 38 people drawn from disciplines including architecture, art, lighting, interior, graphic and theatrical design. Its studios are based in London and Edinburgh, UK.

Light Architecture  
Both founding members Jonathan Speirs, who died on 18 June 2012, and Mark Major trained and practiced as architects before focusing on lighting design. In interviews they argued that light should be embedded at the heart of the architectural design process rather than applied as a ‘cosmetic add-on’. This integral approach to light led them to adopt the term ‘lighting architect’ to describe their role as ‘building with light as opposed to bricks and mortar’. Keith Bradshaw was appointed as a principal in 2009, and the studio was rebranded as Speirs + Major in August 2010, with the studio at that time terming themselves as 'designers who work with light' to reflect the breadth of skill in their team and to encompass their work that included not only lighting architecture, but strategy and branding projects as well as product and innovation. On 24 November 2020, the studio announced a change in name and brand identity to SPEIRS MAJOR to reflect their evolution from an atelier practice to a broader organisation headed by several Partners under the creative directorship of Keith Bradshaw and Mark Major. Moving away from 'designers who work with light' they instated the use of the term "Light Architecture" to better reflect their design ethos, describing themselves as having a "fascination with light, form, space and time." and a desire to "progressively and responsibly use light to improve the experience of the built environment, promote well-being and generate a unique sense of place.”

Notable projects 
K11 Musea, Hong Kong (2019)
Interior lighting for Norwich Cathedral, Norwich, UK (2019) 
The Beverly Center, Los Angeles, United States (2018)
The Macallan Distillery and Visitor Experience, Scotland, UK (2018)
Gasholders London, Kings Cross, UK (2018)
Gasholder Park, King's Cross, London, UK (2016)
La Nuvola (The Cloud), EUR Congressi, Rome, Italy (2016)
Shenzhen Bao'an International Airport, Shenzhen, PRC (2015)
Queen Elizabeth Olympic Park, London, UK (2014)
Maggie's Centre Lanarkshire, Airdrie, UK (2014)
In Lumine Tuo (the lighting of the Dom Church and Dom Tower), Utrecht, The Netherlands (2013)
Burlington Arcade, London (2012)
Marianne North Gallery, Kew Gardens, London, UK (2011) 
Infinity Bridge, Stockton-on-Tees, UK (2009)
Armani Fifth Avenue, New York City, USA (2009)
3 More London Riverside, London, UK (2009)
Sheikh Zayed Mosque, Abu Dhabi, UAE (2008)
Beijing Capital International Airport, Beijing, PRC (2008) 
The restoration of the Royal Festival Hall, London, UK (2007)
Armani / Ginza flagship store, Tokyo, Japan (2007) 
BBC Scotland exterior lighting, Glasgow, UK (2007)
Durham Lighting Strategy, Durham, UK (2007) 
Terminal 4, Barajas Airport, Madrid, Spain (2006) 
The interior of St Paul's Cathedral, London, UK (2006) 
The Sackler Crossing, Kew Gardens, London, UK (2006) 
30 St Mary Axe, (The Gherkin), London, UK (2004) 
The Copenhagen Opera House, Copenhagen, Denmark (2004)
World Squares for All (Trafalgar Square) London, UK (2003)
Gateshead Millennium Bridge, Newcastle upon Tyne, UK (2002) 
Magna Science Adventure Centre, Rotherham, UK (2001) 
The Millennium Dome, Greenwich, London, UK (2000)
Burj Al Arab Hotel exterior, Dubai, UAE (1999)

RIBA Stirling Prize collaborations
Speirs and Major Associates have designed lighting for a number of buildings that have either won or been nominated for the RIBA Stirling Prize for architecture.

Stirling Prize winners:
Maggie's Centre London (Rogers Stirk Harbour + Partners) in 2009
Terminal 4, Barajas Airport, Madrid (Richard Rogers Partnership) in 2006
30 St Mary Axe (The Gherkin), London (Foster and Partners) in 2004
The Gateshead Millennium Bridge (Wilkinson Eyre) in 2002
The Magna Centre, Rotherham (Wilkinson Eyre) in 2001
Stirling Prize shortlisted projects:
The Macallan Distillery and Visitor Experience (Rogers Stirk Harbour + Partners) 2019 (winner TBA)
Maggie's Centre Lanarkshire (Reiach and Hall Architect) in 2015
5, Aldermanbury Square, London (Eric Parry Architects) in 2009
The Royal Festival Hall Restoration (Allies and Morrison) in 2008
The Dresden Main Station Redevelopment (Foster and Partners) in 2007
The Phoenix Initiative, Coventry (MJP Architects) in 2004
The Dance Base, Grassmarket, Edinburgh (Malcolm Fraser Architects) in 2002

Recent awards 
Winner, Community + Public Realm, Lighting Design Awards 2017
Lighting Design Winner, FX Awards 2016
Outstanding Achievement, AL Light & Architecture Design Awards 2013 & 2015
Scottish Design Award 2015
IALD Radiance Award 2014
Winner, Heritage, Lighting Design Awards 2013
Design Practice of the Decade, Lighting Design Awards 2012
IALD Radiance Award 2010
PLD Recognition Award for Best New Project 2009
IALD Radiance Award 2009
IALD Radiance Award 2008
Light and Architecture Award 2008
FX Design Award for Best Lighting 2008
IESNA Award of Merit 2007
IESNA Award of Distinction 2007
Lighting Designer of the Year (UK) 2007
FX Design Award for Best Lighting 2007
FX Design Award for Best Lighting 2005
IALD Award of Excellence 2005
Lighting Designer of the Decade, Light Magazine (UK) 2005

Bibliography 
In 2006 Jonathan Speirs and Mark Major authored the book Made of Light: The Art of Light and Architecture, a series of visual essays on lighting design. The book is co-authored by Anthony Tischhauser and published by Swiss architectural publisher Birkhäuser.

Notes and references

External links
 Speirs + Major website

Architectural lighting design
Lighting designers
Architecture firms of the United Kingdom